Valentinite is an antimony oxide mineral with formula Sb2O3. Valentinite crystallizes in the orthorhombic system and typically forms as radiating clusters of euhedral crystals or as fibrous masses. It is colorless to white with occasional shades or tints of yellow and red. It has a Mohs hardness of 2.5 to 3 and a specific gravity of 5.76.  Valentinite occurs as a weathering product of stibnite and other antimony minerals. It is dimorphous with the isometric antimony oxide senarmontite.

Historical data
Valentinite is a mineral named in the middle of the 19th century in honour of Basilius Valentinus, a writer on alchemy. He is the supposed author of the first book to give a detailed description of antimony and its compounds. From the contents of the book it is also obvious that Valentinus was familiar with the synthetic preparation of antimony trioxide, which was called 'the antimony flower'.

Valentinite was first described in 1845 for an occurrence in the Les Chalanches Mine, Allemond, Isère, Auvergne-Rhône-Alpes, France. The first description of its occurrence in the region of Příbram in Bohemia comes roughly from the same time. This particular locality at one time produced the very best crystals of this mineral. The largest crystals found there measured up to 3 cm. Grouped in rich druses, they developed in vein cavities with galena.

Occurrence

Valentinite is a weathering product of hydrothermal antimony-bearing veins, where it forms as a secondary mineral through oxidation in the upper parts of the deposits. It occurs associated with stibnite, native antimony, stibiconite, cervantite, kermesite and tetrahedrite.

A rich deposit of valentinite has been found in the Constantine province of Algeria. This is the only deposit where it is mined as an ore, with 83% antimony. In all other locations it occurs in negligible quantities.

See also
List of minerals
List of minerals named after people

References

Antimony minerals
Oxide minerals
Orthorhombic minerals
Minerals in space group 56